The Stalag Luft III murders were war crimes perpetrated by members of the Gestapo following the "Great Escape" of Allied prisoners of war from the German Air Force prison camp known as Stalag Luft III on March 25, 1944. Of the 76 successful escapees, 73 were recaptured, most within several days of the breakout, 50 of whom were executed on the personal orders of Adolf Hitler. These summary executions were conducted within a short period following recapture.

Outrage at the killings was expressed immediately, both in the prison camp, among comrades of the escaped prisoners and in the United Kingdom, where Foreign Secretary Anthony Eden rose in the House of Commons to announce in June 1944 that those guilty of what the British government suspected was a war crime would be "brought to exemplary justice."

After Nazi Germany's capitulation in May 1945, the Police branch of the Royal Air Force, with whom the 50 airmen had been serving, launched a special investigation into the killings, having branded the shootings a war crime despite official German reports that the airmen had been shot while attempting to escape from captivity following recapture. An extensive investigation headed by Wing Commander Wilfred Bowes (RAF) and Squadron Leader Frank McKenna of the Special Investigation Branch into the events following the recapture of the 73 airmen was launched, which was unique for being the only major war crime to be investigated by a single branch of any nation's military.

Murders

The day after the mass escape from Stalag Luft III, Hitler initially gave personal orders that every recaptured officer was to be shot. Reichsmarschall Hermann Göring, head of the Luftwaffe, Reichsführer-SS Heinrich Himmler, chief of state security, and Field Marshal Wilhelm Keitel, head of the German High Command, who had ultimate control over prisoners of war, argued about the responsibility for the escape. Göring pointed out to Hitler that a massacre might bring about reprisals against German pilots in Allied hands. Hitler agreed, but insisted "more than half" were to be shot, eventually ordering Himmler to execute more than half of the escapees. Himmler fixed the total at 50. Keitel gave orders that the murdered officers were to be cremated and their ashes returned to the POW camp as a deterrent to further escapes. Himmler set up the logistics for actually killing the men, and passed it down through his subordinates in the Gestapo. The general orders were that recaptured officers would be turned over to the Criminal Police, and fifty would be handed to the Gestapo to be killed.

As the prisoners were recaptured, they were interrogated for any useful information and taken out by motor car, usually in small parties of two at a time, on the pretext of returning them to their prison camp. Their Gestapo escorts would stop them in the country and invite the officers to relieve themselves. The prisoners were then shot at close range from behind by pistol or machine pistol fire. The bodies were then left for retrieval, after which they were cremated and returned to Stalag Luft III.

British Military Intelligence was made aware of the extraordinary events even during conditions of wartime by letters home and as a result of communications from the protecting power, Switzerland, which as a neutral party regularly reported on conditions in prisoner camps to both sides. Notices posted in Allied POW camps on 23 July 1944 that "THE ESCAPE FROM PRISON CAMPS IS NO LONGER A SPORT" in the wake of the Stalag Luft III escape, as well as the suspicious deaths of fifty officers during their recapture, led the British government to suspect a war crime had occurred.
The British government learned initially of 47 deaths after a routine visit to the camp by the Swiss authorities as the protecting power in May; Foreign Secretary Anthony Eden announced this news to the House of Commons on 19 May 1944. Shortly after the announcement the Senior British Officer of the camp, Group Captain Herbert Massey, was repatriated to England due to ill health. Upon his return, he informed the Government about the circumstances of the escape and the reality of the murder of the recaptured escapees. With the information received from Massey along with the official notification of the 50 deaths from the German Government, Eden updated Parliament on 23 June, promising that, at the end of the war, those responsible would be brought to exemplary justice.

Victims

Investigation
A detachment of the Special Investigation Branch of the Royal Air Force Police, headed by Wing Commander Wilfred Bowes, was given the assignment of tracking down the killers of the 50 officers. The investigation started seventeen months after the alleged crimes had been committed, making it a cold case. Worse, according to an account of the investigation, the perpetrators "belonged to a body, the Secret State Police or Gestapo, which held and exercised every facility to provide its members with false identities and forged identification papers[;] immediately they were ordered to go on the run at the moment of national surrender."

The small detachment of investigators, numbering 5 officers and 14 NCOs, remained active for 3 years, and identified 72 men as guilty of either murder or conspiracy to murder, of whom 69 were accounted for. Of these, 21 were eventually tried and executed (some of these for other than the Stalag Luft III murders); 17 were tried and imprisoned; 11 had committed suicide; 7 were untraced, although 4 of these were presumed dead; 6 had been killed during the war; 5 were arrested but not charged; 1 was arrested but not charged so he could be used as a material witness; 3 were charged but either acquitted or had the sentence quashed on review; and 1 remained in refuge in East Germany.

Despite attempts to cover up the murders during the war, the investigators were aided by such things as Germany's meticulous bookkeeping, such as at various crematoria, as well as willing eyewitness accounts and many confessions among the Gestapo members themselves, who cited that they were only following orders.

Accused

High command

RSHA leadership

Gestapo field officers

Trials

SS-Gruppenführer Arthur Nebe, who is believed to have selected the airmen to be shot, was later executed by the Nazis for his involvement in the 20 July plot to kill Hitler.

American Colonel Telford Taylor was the U.S. prosecutor in the High Command case at the Nuremberg trials. The indictment in this case called for the General Staff of the Army and the High Command of the German Armed Forces to be considered criminal organizations; the witnesses were several of the surviving German Field Marshals and their staff officers. One of the crimes charged was of the murder of the 50. Luftwaffe Colonel Bernd von Brauchitsch, who served on the staff of Reich Marshal Hermann Göring, was interrogated by Captain Horace Hahn about the murders.

The first trial specifically dealing with the Stalag Luft III murders began on 1 July 1947, against 18 defendants. The trial was held before No. 1 War Crimes Court at the Curio Haus in Hamburg. The accused all pleaded Not Guilty to the counts indicated on the table below; names in the final column are the victims that they were accused of murdering. The verdicts and sentences were handed down after a full fifty days on 3 September of that year. Max Wielen was found guilty of conspiracy and sentenced to life imprisonment. The others were found not guilty of the first two charges, but guilty of the individual charges of murder. Breithaupt received life imprisonment, Denkmann and Struve ten years' imprisonment each, and Boschert eventually received life imprisonment. The other 13 condemned prisoners were hanged at Hamelin Prison in February 1948 by British executioner Albert Pierrepoint.

A second trial began in Hamburg on 11 October 1948, with verdicts and sentences being reached by November 6. In the interim, however, Ernest Bevin, the British Foreign Secretary, announced a Cabinet decision not to prosecute any more war criminals after 31 August 1948.

In popular culture

The murders were shown (as a single massacre rather than individuals or small groups being murdered) in the 1963 film The Great Escape.

The search for the culprits responsible for the murder of the 50 Allied officers was depicted in The Great Escape II: The Untold Story.

A dramatisation of the investigation, written by Robin Brooks and Robert Radcliffe, was featured in the BBC Radio 4 "Saturday Drama" series, first broadcast on 13 April 2013.

References

Nazi war crimes in Germany
History of the Royal Air Force during World War II
1944 in Germany
Mass murder in 1944
World War II prisoner of war massacres by Nazi Germany
Police misconduct in Germany
March 1944 events
April 1944 events
Nazi war crimes in Czechoslovakia